The Roman Catholic Diocese of Varaždin is an ecclesiastical territory or diocese of the Catholic Church in northern Croatia. The diocese is centred in the city of Varaždin. It is a new diocese, having only been erected on July 5, 1997 from the Archdiocese of Zagreb. Bishop Marko Culej was the first to be head of the diocese. Bishop Bože Radoš is the current bishop of Varaždin.

The Church of the Assumption of Mary into Heaven was built in 1646 and was proclaimed a cathedral on September 28, 1997.

The diocese's patron saint is Saint Marko of Križevci.

Bishops
 Marko Culej (5 July 1997 – 19 August 2006)
 Josip Mrzljak (20 March 2007 – 1 August 2019)
 Bože Radoš (since 1 August 2019)

See also 

 Varaždin
 Varaždin county

References

External links 
Diocese of Varaždin 

Varazdin
Christian organizations established in 1997
Roman Catholic dioceses and prelatures established in the 20th century
1997 establishments in Croatia